Oolooloo is the second album by the ska/soul band the Pietasters, released in 1995.

It was reissued on vinyl in 2012.

Critical reception

The Province called the band "lighter of touch and breezier than most of their contemporaries." In 1997, the Albuquerque Journal included Oolooloo at No. 2 on its list of 10 essential ska albums.

Track listing
 "Something Better" (Raecke/Goodin) – 3:31
 "Freak Show" (Eckhardt/Goodin/Jackson) – 3:00
 "Tell You Why" (Goodin/Jackson/Roberts/Watt) – 4:05
 "Maggie Mae" (Goodin/Raecke/Eckhardt) – 3:01
 "It's the Same Old Song" (Holland/Dozier/Holland) – 3:02
 "Pleasure Bribe" (Eckhardt/Jackson/Goodin) – 3:52
 "Girl Take It Easy" (Goodin/Linares) – 5:03
 "Can I Change My Mind" (Tyrone Davis, arrg: Goodin/Jackson) – 6:00
 "Night Before" (Goodin/Jackson) – 3:21
 "Biblical Sense" (Goodin) – 3:30
 "Movin' on Up" (Eckhardt/Goodin/Linares/Roberts) – 4:05

Personnel
 Stephen Jackson – vocals
 Tom Goodin – guitar
 Chris Watt – bass guitar
 Todd Eckhardt – guitar, bass guitar, backing vocals
 Rob Steward – drums
 Eric Raecke – saxophone
 Alan Makranczy – saxophone
 Jeremy Roberts – trombone, backing vocals
 Carlos Linares – trumpet
 Toby Hansen – trumpet
 Paul T. Ackerman – keyboards
 Vic Rice – producer, mixing
 Shannon Walton – engineer

References

1995 albums
The Pietasters albums